Neu-Signau Castle is a ruined castle in the municipality of Bowil in the canton of Bern in Switzerland.

History 
The castle was built to replace Alt-Signau Castle as the residence of the Barons of Signau.  It was intended to protect and control the road between the Emmental and Aare river valley.  In 1826 the castle was demolished.

Location and description
The castle is situated on a conglomerate spur above Bowil village.  On an opposite hill, across the valley are the ruins of Alt-Signau Castle.  Today, only a few traces of the castle can be seen.

See also
 List of castles in Switzerland

References

 Burgenkarte der Schweiz - West: , Bundesamt für Landestopografie swisstopo, 2007

External links
 
 History of Signau from signau.ch

Castles in the Canton of Bern